Woratep Rattana-umpawan (born August 1, 1969 in Bangkok) is a classical guitarist from Thailand.  He is the founder of the Thailand Guitar Society and the Asia International Guitar Festival, Bangkok.

Life
Woratep Rattana-umpawan began his guitar lessons when he was 12. He was the First Prize Winner of the Yamaha Guitar Festival Competition in Bangkok for three consecutive years from 1985-1987.  In 1987 he entered the Faculty of Fine and Applied Arts, Chulalongkorn University and got a B.A. with second class honors in Western Music, majoring in Classical Guitar.

With his talents and skills in performance, he was invited to play solo in the "Chao Phraya Concerto" composed by Prof. Bruce Gaston in 1993.

Woratep was once again invited by one of the most famous musical institutions in Japan to perform in three recitals in April 2000. And in November 2000, he had an opportunity to take a private lesson with Mr. Eduardo Fernandez, the world famous guitarist, when Fernandez was performing a concert in Bangkok.

Woratep performs at international guitar festivals in many parts of the world and often in duo with Leon Koudelak.
His works such as Guitar Lai Thai I, II are available on cassettes and CDs.
Woratep is the first Thai classical guitarist who has performed worldwide at International Guitar Festivals is the first Thai classical guitarist to be well known in the world.

Teaching
In 1991 Woratep was Head of the Guitar Department at Chinatkarn Music School.

Woratep Rattana-umpawan is full-time teacher at the Conservatory of Music, Rangsit University in Bangkok and also taught at the Thailand Guitar Society. His influence and involvement in education had great influence on the younger Thai guitarist generation.

Guitars
Woratep uses a "Torres" replica by Yuichi Imai.

Discography
Guitar Lai Thai
Guitar Lai Thai vol.2

Editions
Two Thai Traditional Songs
(Soi Saeng Daeng, Kahmane Lai Kwa-ai,Chern Jao)
Edition "Homa Dream" HM099

References

External links
Biography and photo
 http://thailandguitarsociety.com
 http://aigf.weebly.com

Woratep Rattana-umpawan
Living people
1969 births